The 2019 Singapore Premier League (also known as the AIA Singapore Premier League due to sponsorship reasons) was the 2nd season of the Singapore Premier League, the top-flight Singaporean professional league for association football clubs, since its rebranding in 2018. A major overhaul from the new FAS management was made from this season onwards to improve the standard of Singapore football.

Rules 
The following key changes were made to the rules for the 2019 season:

 Singapore Premier League clubs could sign three imports from next season after the increase in foreign player quota was raised at the Football Association of Singapore's 36th Annual Congress 
 From 2019, only four stadiums host regular matches.  The 8 teams (excluding DPMM) will host the matches in the following stadiums.  Our Tampines Hub (Tampines Rovers and Geylang International), Jalan Besar Stadium (Young Lions and Hougang United), Bishan Stadium (Home United and Balestier Khalsa) and Jurong East Stadium (Albirex Niigata and Warriors FC).
 For 2019, Albirex is allowed to sign as many locals as their budget allows. However, the club are only allowed one Singaporean over the age of 23. Also, Albirex must have two Singaporeans in their starting lineup for each game.
 Each team is now able to register up to 28 players in their squad, an increase of 3 players as compared to 2018.

Teams 
A total of 9 teams compete in the league. Albirex Niigata (S) and DPMM FC are invited foreign clubs from Japan and Brunei respectively. Despite large criticism and discussion against the Young Lions project, the Young Lions will continue to compete till 2019 for the purposes of training and preparing for the 2019 SEA Games. The criticism mainly focused on the poor performances every season by the largely youth team made up of Singapore Football's brightest prospects. Season-long consecutive losses against the rest of the more mature teams inflicts serious long-term consequences on the morale of the players, considering that most of these players are in the developmental ages of their footballing career. The new age restrictions imposed on the rest of the Singapore Premier League clubs could be seen as giving the Young Lions a better advantage in terms of seniority, but most critics and fans of Singapore football are still wanting the FAS to abolish the FAS-managed Young Lions and have them developed under the guidance of genuine local clubs.

Stadiums and locations

Personnel and sponsors
Note: Flags indicate national team as has been defined under FIFA eligibility rules. Players may hold more than one non-FIFA nationality.

Coaching changes

Foreigners 
Singapore Premier League clubs could sign three imports from next season after the increase in foreign player quota was raised at the Football Association of Singapore's 36th Annual Congress

Albirex Niigata can sign up unlimited number of Singaporean players for the new season.  Only 1 local player above 23 years old is allowed.

Players name in bold indicates the player was registered during the mid-season transfer window.

Note 1: Albirex, a Japanese club, is allowed to sign as many locals as their budget allows. However, the club are only allowed one Singaporean over the age of 23. 

Note 2: DPMM FC, a Bruneian club, can sign 3 non-Bruneian foreigners.

Note 3: Singapore teams can sign 4 foreigners, of which 2 must be below 21 years old.

Results

League table

Statistics

Top scorers
As of 29 Sept 2019.

Top Assists
As of 29 Sept 2019.

Clean Sheet
As of 29 Sept 2019.

Hat-tricks 

Note
4 Player scored 4 goals
5 Player scored 5 goals

Own goal

Penalty missed

Awards

Monthly awards

Singapore Premier League Awards night winners

References

External links
 Football Association of Singapore website
 Singapore Premier League website

2019
1
2019 in Asian association football leagues